Désirée Nosbusch a.k.a. Désirée Becker (born 14 January 1965) is a Luxembourger actress and television presenter. She was born in Esch-sur-Alzette, Luxembourg to a Luxembourgish father and Italian mother. In the 1980s she lived in Manhattan, and from the 1990s to 2008 in Los Angeles, California.

Biography
Nosbusch speaks Luxembourgish, German, French, Italian and English. She has acted in both French-language and German-language films and television productions since her mid-teens. She was a member of the youth drama group of the Lycée Hubert Clément of Esch-sur-Alzette (Luxembourg), and appeared in some Italian-language TV miniseries. She presented the Eurovision Song Contest 1984 in Luxembourg, and hosted a kids' version of the game show Ruck Zuck called "Kinder Ruck Zuck". 

Nosbusch is also a singer. In 1984 she recorded a duet with Austrian singer Falco, "Kann es Liebe sein?".

Selected filmography
  (1981, directed by Wolf Gremm)
 Der Fan (1982, directed by Eckhart Schmidt)
  (1983, TV film, directed by Rolf von Sydow)
 Sing Sing (1983, directed by Sergio Corbucci)
 Questo e Quello (1983, directed by Sergio Corbucci)
 Good Morning, Babylon (1987, directed by Paolo and Vittorio Taviani)
  (1988, directed by )
  (1989, directed by Andy Bausch)
  (1990, directed by )
  (1990, directed by José Pinheiro)
  (1991, TV film, directed by Andy Bausch)
  (1993, TV miniseries, directed by Florestano Vancini)
 The Way to Dusty Death (1995, TV film, directed by Geoffrey Reeve)
 Opernball (1998, TV film, directed by Urs Egger)
 Amico mio (1998, TV series, directed by Paolo Poeti)
 Contaminated Man (2000, directed by Anthony Hickox)
 High Explosive (2001, directed by Timothy Bond)
 Hostile Takeover (2001, directed by Carl Schenkel)
  (2008, TV film, directed by )
  (2018, directed by Félix Koch)
 Bad Banks (2018, TV series)
 Capitani (2019, TV series)

See also
 List of Eurovision Song Contest presenters

External links

 Désirée Nosbusch fanpage

1965 births
Living people
People from Esch-sur-Alzette
Luxembourgian film actresses
Luxembourgian television actresses
Luxembourgian television personalities
Luxembourgian people of Italian descent
Luxembourgian expatriates in the United States
20th-century Luxembourgian actresses
21st-century Luxembourgian actresses